The London Electricity Board was the public sector utility company responsible for the supply and distribution of electricity to domestic, commercial and industrial consumers in London prior to 1990. It also sold and made available for hire and hire-purchase domestic electrical appliances through local showrooms where electricity bills could also be paid. It was shortened to LEB in its green and blue logo, consisting of the three letters. As London Electricity plc it was listed on the London Stock Exchange and was once a constituent of the FTSE 100 Index.

History
The board was formed as the London Electricity Board on 1 April 1948 as part of the nationalisation of the electricity industry by the Electricity Act 1947. The LEB was privatised in 1990 under the Electricity Act 1989, as London Electricity plc.

The company was acquired by Entergy, a US company, in 1996 and then by Électricité de France in November 1998.

Notable employees of the business include former prime minister John Major and the former archbishop of Canterbury, George Carey.

Chairmen of the LEB
 1948–1956, Henry John Randall (born 30 December 1894 London, died 5 May 1967 Buckinghamshire), previously managing director of the City of London Electric Lighting Company.
 1956–1968, David Blair Irving (born 9 November 1903, died 9 June 1986)
 1968–1972, Wilfrid David Drysdale Fenton (born 27 March 1908, died 4 May 1985)
 1972–1976, Owen Francis (born 4 October 1912, died 26 July 2005)
 1976–1981, Alan Plumpton (born 24 November 1926)
 1981–1986, David G Jefferies
 1986–1990, John Wilson

Other members of the board were: Deputy Chairman C.G. Moss (1964, 1967), Full-time member C.A.F. Beaumont (1964, 1967).

Customers 
The total number of customers supplied by the board were:

Electricity sales 
The amount of electricity sold, in GWh, by the LEB over its operational life was as follows:

References

See also
 List of pre-nationalisation UK electric power companies
 EDF Energy

Electric power companies of the United Kingdom
Energy companies established in 1990
Defunct companies based in London
British companies established in 1990
Companies formerly listed on the London Stock Exchange
1948 establishments in England